was produced by Tsuburaya Productions, Chubu-Nippon Broadcasting (CBC), and Dentsu. It was the 18th entry in the Ultra Series. The series aired on Tokyo Broadcasting System, including TBS, CBC, MBS, etc. The show ran from October 2, 2004 until June 25, 2005, with a total of 37 broadcast episodes. Subsequent DVD releases from Bandai Visual saw a brand new 45-minute Episode EX and an extended 45-minute Director's Cut of Episode 29.

On April 24, 2017, Toku announced that the series would be broadcast in the United States on its channel beginning May 9, 2017 until June 2, 2017.

History 

Ultraman Nexus was part of Tsuburaya Productions' Ultra N Project, an experiment in 2004 to re-invent Ultraman for a new generation of fans. Prior to this, however, Tsuburaya had begun a project called Ultra Collaboration 2 at the end of 2003, which involved a brand-new radio adaptation of Ultra Q called The Ultra Q Club. The project was also due to include a new TV series called Ultraman Noa in early 2004, which is presumably what Ultraman Nexus evolved into. Following the success of the new radio show, Tsuburaya forged a brand-new season, Ultra Q: Dark Fantasy on April 6, 2004, a show which attracted top-rung directors such as Shusuke Kaneko (popular with fans for his work on the Gamera series and Godzilla, Mothra and King Ghidorah: Giant Monsters All-Out Attack).

The first stage of the Ultra N Project was entitled Noa: Nostalgia. The project mascot, Ultraman Noa, was a rather radical change design - an all-silver Ultraman with protruding wings on its back. Ultraman Noa was mainly used for live stage shows and merchandising. The second stage of the project was Next: Evolution. This saw the creation of a new theatrical film, ULTRAMAN. The final stage was Nexus: Trinity - the piece that ties the entire project together. Unlike the previous series Ultraman Cosmos, which was strictly aimed at young children, Ultraman Nexus was the first Ultraman TV series specifically aimed at adults. The show abandons the traditional monster-of-the-week stories in order to be replaced with longer character-based story arcs. Tsuburaya Productions had intended the show to be run during prime time, but the CBC network gave the show a 7:30 AM Saturday morning slot once Pretty Guardian Sailor Moon ended its 49-episode run. The TV series received weak ratings which were attributed to the change in style and not being able to have the target demographic tune in, resulting in the series being cut short from around 50 episodes down to 37.

Three months after its initial run, it was re-run in a new time slot. This time the show aired at 2:30 AM on Tuesday mornings and the ratings met the expectations that were set for the Ultra N Project. Following the ULTRAMAN movie, Tsuburaya ran a teaser trailer for Ultraman 2 Requiem. Due to the performance of Ultraman Nexus, the film was canceled, and Tsuburaya moved ahead with a theatrical version of the then-current television series, Ultraman Mebius.

Story 

Taking place four years after the events of Ultraman: The Next (2008, the series progresses into 2009 before the finale), Nexus focuses on the viewpoint of Night Raider rookie Kazuki Komon in the fight against Space Beast threats. During their mission, Komon frequently comes in contact with the titular Ultraman and the relationship he established with the latter's hosts.

At the start of the series, Ultraman Nexus bonds with ex-cameraman Jun Himeya, who was traumatized by his inability to save a young girl from his past. Despite Komon's good relationship with Himeya, TLT views him as a threat regardless of Ultraman's constant attempts in rescuing them. The reveal of Komon's girlfriend, Riko Saida as Dark Faust and her immediate sacrifice nearly sent him into despair until Himeya and Nagi managed to bring him to his senses. Sometime later, Night Raider deserter Shinya Mizorogi returned as the host of Dark Mephisto and captured a weakened Nexus in the Land of the Dead, aiming to strengthen himself with the Ultraman's power, but Himeya's renewed courage and the Night Raider's help resurrected the hero back to life. The battle between two giants resulted in a massive explosion that seemingly claimed their lives, but Himeya reassures Komon that the batton of light shall be passed to someone else.

Not long after, the light of Nexus was inherited by Ren Senjyu, a Promethean child with a short life expectancy who escaped from America to spend the remainder of his life in happiness. In the same way as his predecessor Himeya, Ren becomes fast friends with Komon and develops a relationship with Mizuo, a Memory Police who was sent to spy on him. After redeeming himself, a dying Mizorogi exposed the traitor to be a Night Raider member. Ren eventually outlived his original life expectancy due to the Raphael drug's intervention, but the light of Nexus left him for another candidate.

When the light finally chooses Nagi, the perpetrator behind all Space Beast attacks reveals himself and gloats about how the past events were all for the sake of having Nagi inherit Nexus' light and revive himself. By tricking Nagi into transforming, the Unknown absorbed her into Lethe as he resurrected him in the form of Dark Zagi to attack the city. Komon managed to save Nagi from the darkness as his actions allow him to inherit the light. Transforming into Nexus, Komon used up the forms of his predecessors and their memories until encouragement by the public allows him to evolve into Nexus' long-lost form; Ultraman Noa. With his full power, the silver giant expels Zagi to space and puts an end to his doppelganger. A year later, the Space Beast threat has become public knowledge but is put under control with TLT's expended forces.

Episodes

Episode.01: 
Episode.02: 
Episode.03: 
Episode.04: 
Episode.05: 
Episode.06: 
Episode.07: 
Episode.08: 
Episode.09: 
Episode.10: 
Episode.11: 
Episode.12: 
Episode.13: 
Episode.14: 
Episode.15: 
Episode.16: 
Episode.17: 
Episode.18: 
Episode.19: 
Episode.20: 
Episode.21: 
Episode.22: 
Episode.23: 
Episode.24: 
Episode.25: 
Episode.26: 
Episode.27: 
Episode.28: 
Episode.29: 
Episode.29: 
Episode.30: 
Episode.31: 
Episode.EX: 
Episode.32: 
Episode.33: 
Episode.34: 
Episode.35: 
Episode.36: 
Episode.37:

Cast
: 
: 
: 
: 
: 
: 
//: 
: 
: 
: 
: 
/: 
: 
/: 
: 
: 
: 
: 
: 
: 
:

Voice actors
: 
: 

Guest cast
: 
: 
: 
: 
:

English Dub
An english dub of the series was produced by Warner Bros. and produced in there state house by Warner Bros. the dub aired on Kids WB, which was formely named Fox Kids,Childrens block on The WB in the United States in 2003.

Kids WB's adaptation served as a dark comedic parody of the original Ultraman series English Adaptation produced by Peter Fernandez and, as such made some spooky changes. such as include monsters getting new sound effects producing a new theme song soundtrack and for that part of the US was due to Kids WB' indecesion wheither to seitherize the show into a superhero or make it dark.

English Dub Cast
 Cam Clarke as Hinmeya Jun
 Andrew Francis as Ren Senjyu
 Greg Cipes as Kazuki Komon
 Jessica DiCicco as Nagi Sajiyo
 Maurice LaMarche as Yu Kirasawa
 Tara Strong as Sara Mizuhara
 Vanessa Marshall as Shiori Hikari
 Jason Marsden as Eiuske Wakura
 Lacey Chabert as Mizuo Nonomiya
 James Hong as Yoichiro Matsunaga
 Rob Paulsen as Mitsuhiko Ishibori
 Kevin Michael Richardson as Shinya Mizorogi
 Candi Milo as Riko Saida
 Kari Wahlgren as Dark Faust

Songs 
Opening themes

Lyrics, Composition, & Arrangement: 
Artist: doa
Episodes: 1-25
This song is used as the ending theme of episode 37.

Lyrics: Daiki Yoshimoto
Composition & Arrangement: Akihito Tokunaga
Artist: doa
Episodes: 26-37
The opening uses the second verse of the full song.
Ending themes
 
Lyrics & Composition: U-ka Saegusa
Arrangement: 
Artist: U-ka Saegusa in dB
Episodes: 1-13
 
Lyrics: U-ka Saegusa
Composition: 
Arrangement: Masazumi Ozawa
Artist: U-ka Saegusa in dB
Episodes: 14-25
 
Lyrics & Artist: Rina Aiuchi
Composition: 
Arrangement: Masazumi Ozawa
Episodes: 26-36
Image songs
"Fight the Future ~ Ultraman Nexus Theme ~"
Lyrics: Goro Matsui 
Composition: Kawai Kenji 
Arrangement: Yushima Kuwashima 
Artist: Project DMM
"Acupuncture of light"
Lyrics: KATSUMI 
Composition / Arrangement: Daimon Kazuya 
Artist: Project DMM

Video game
A video game based on the series was produced by Bandai for the PlayStation 2, under the name Ultraman Nexus.

Home media
In July 2020, Shout! Factory announced to have struck a multi-year deal with Alliance Entertainment and Mill Creek, with the blessings of Tsuburaya and Indigo, that granted them the exclusive SVOD and AVOD digital rights to the Ultra series and films (1,100 TV episodes and 20 films) acquired by Mill Creek the previous year. Ultraman Nexus, amongst other titles, will stream in the United States and Canada through Shout! Factory TV and Tokushoutsu.

References

External links 

 
Official website of Tsuburaya Productions 
Ultraman Connection — Official website 
Official Ultraman channel at YouTube

2004 Japanese television series debuts
2005 Japanese television series endings
Ultra N Project
Ultra television series
Japanese science fiction television series
Television shows set in Japan
Fiction about murder
TBS Television (Japan) original programming